Skyhaven Airport  is a public-use airport located three miles (5 km) southeast of the central business district of Rochester, a city in Strafford County, New Hampshire, United States. The airport is owned and operated by the Pease Development Authority, with fixed-base operator (FBO) services provided by Skyhaven Aviation Services. It is included in the Federal Aviation Administration (FAA) National Plan of Integrated Airport Systems for 2017–2021, in which it is categorized as a local general aviation facility.

Although most U.S. airports use the same three-letter location identifier for the FAA and IATA, Skyhaven Airport is assigned DAW by the FAA but has no designation from the IATA.

Facilities and aircraft 
For the 12-month period ending July 31, 2006, the airport had 17,000 general aviation aircraft operations, an average of 46 per day. At that time there were 106 aircraft based at this airport: 85% single-engine, 3% multi-engine, 1% jet and 11% ultralight.

References

External links 

Airports in New Hampshire
Rochester, New Hampshire
Transportation buildings and structures in Strafford County, New Hampshire